Koula Agagiotou (1915 – 25 October 2006) was a Greek actress. She is probably best known for her role in the Greek sitcom To Retire.

Biography
Agagiotou's real name was Angeliki. She appeared in more than fifty films, including a well-received performance in the 1971 film Evdokia. Her last appearance was in To Retire.

Agagiotou was married and had a daughter.

Filmography
Agagiotou made her film debut in 1951. She mostly appeared in dramas, and during the 1980s she participated in cult comedies such as Kamikazi Agapi Mou alongside Stathis Psaltis.

External links

1915 births
2006 deaths
Actresses from Athens
Greek television actresses
Greek film actresses